The 1974–75 Yorkshire Cup was the sixty-seventh occasion on which the  Yorkshire Cup competition had been held.

Hull Kingston Rovers won the trophy by beating Wakefield Trinity by the score of 16-13

The match was played at Headingley, Leeds, now in West Yorkshire. The attendance was 5,823 and receipts were £3,090

It was also the second consecutive Yorkshire Cup final appearances by Wakefield Trinity, both of which would result in defeat

Background 
This season there were no junior/amateur clubs taking part, no new entrants and no "leavers" and so the total of entries remained the  same at sixteen.

This in turn resulted in no byes in the first round.

Competition and results

Round 1 
Involved  8 matches (with no byes) and 16 clubs

Round 2 - Quarter-finals 
Involved 4 matches and 8 clubs

Round 3 – Semi-finals  
Involved 2 matches and 4 clubs

Semi-final - replays  
Involved  1 match and 2 clubs

Final

Teams and scorers 

Scoring - Try = three points - Goal = two points - Drop goal = one point

The road to success

Notes and comments 
1 * The first Yorkshire Cup match played at this Elland Road Greyhound Stadium

2 * The score is given incorrectly as 0-10 by the  John Player yearbook 1975–76  but as 23-10 by  the RUGBYLEAGUEproject and others

3 * The date is given as Wednesday 11 September by RUGBYLEAGUEproject  but by the official Hull archives as Tuesday 10 September.

4 * Headingley, Leeds, is the home ground of Leeds RLFC with a capacity of 21,000. The record attendance was  40,175 for a league match between Leeds and Bradford Northern on 21 May 1947.

General information for those unfamiliar 
The Rugby League Yorkshire Cup competition was a knock-out competition between (mainly professional) rugby league clubs from  the  county of Yorkshire. The actual area was at times increased to encompass other teams from  outside the  county such as Newcastle, Mansfield, Coventry, and even London (in the form of Acton & Willesden).

The Rugby League season always (until the onset of "Summer Rugby" in 1996) ran from around August-time through to around May-time and this competition always took place early in the season, in the Autumn, with the final taking place in (or just before) December (The only exception to this was when disruption of the fixture list was caused during, and immediately after, the two World Wars)

See also 
1974–75 Northern Rugby Football League season
Rugby league county cups

References

External links
Saints Heritage Society
1896–97 Northern Rugby Football Union season at wigan.rlfans.com 
Hull&Proud Fixtures & Results 1896/1897
Widnes Vikings - One team, one passion Season In Review - 1896-97
The Northern Union at warringtonwolves.org

1974 in English rugby league
RFL Yorkshire Cup